In modal logic, a classical modal logic L is any modal logic containing (as axiom or theorem) the duality of the modal operators

that is also closed under the rule

Alternatively, one can give a dual definition of L by which L is classical if and only if it contains (as axiom or theorem)

and is closed under the rule

The weakest classical system is sometimes referred to as E and is non-normal. Both algebraic and neighborhood semantics characterize familiar classical modal systems that are weaker than the weakest normal modal logic K.

Every regular modal logic is classical, and every normal modal logic is regular and hence classical.

References

 Chellas, Brian. Modal Logic: An Introduction. Cambridge University Press, 1980.

Modal logic